Kanoria PG Mahila Mahavidyalaya is a girls' college in Jaipur city in Rajasthan state in India. It is situated on JLN Marg near the University campus. The college is a fully private organization administered. The college offers undergraduate courses. The college is affiliated to University of Rajasthan.

Programs & Courses 
Kanoria PG Mahila Mahavidyalaya offers several programs at various levels

Under Graduate Courses
 B.A. 
 B.A. Honours
 B.Com
 B.B.A
 B.Sc Biology
 B.Sc. Maths
 B.Sc. Biotechnology
 B.Sc. Home Science
 B.C.A

References

India today

External links

Women's universities and colleges in Jaipur
Educational institutions established in 1965
1965 establishments in Rajasthan